Slagle Ridge is a high and massive snow-covered ridge between Slone Glacier and Burnette Glacier in the Admiralty Mountains. Mapped by United States Geological Survey (USGS) from surveys and U.S. Navy air photos, 1960–63. Named by Advisory Committee on Antarctic Names (US-ACAN) for Captain Thomas D. Slagle, U.S. Navy, Chief Medical Officer at Little America V in 1958.

Ridges of Victoria Land
Borchgrevink Coast